Pittston Area School District (PASD) is a mid-sized school district located in the Greater Pittston area of Luzerne County, Pennsylvania, the north-eastern part of the state, in the United States. The school district serves students from the city of Pittston, the boroughs of Avoca, Dupont, Duryea, Hughestown, Yatesville, Jenkins, and Pittston townships. Pittston Area School District encompasses approximately 42 square miles. According to 2000 federal census data, it serves a resident population of 30,034.  In 2069, the residents' per capita income was $16,811 and the median family income was $40,063. Per school district officials, in school year 2005–06, the PASD provided basic educational services to 3,147 pupils through the employment of 196 teachers, 159 full-time and part-time support personnel, and 10 administrators.

PASD was created in 1969 by merging Pittston School District, Pittston Township School District, Hughestown School District, Dupont School District, Duryea School District, and Avoca School District. The first superintendent was Martin Mattei. PASD currently runs four schools: Pittston Area Senior High School in Yatesville (grades 9 through 12), Martin L. Mattei Middle School in Pittston (grades 5 through 8), Pittston Area Intermediate Center in Pittston (grades 2 through 4), Pittston Area Primary School in Hughestown (Kindergarten and first grades).

Notable alumni
Jimmy Cefalo
Charley Trippi

References

External links
 
 Official Website Class of 2012 PA

School districts established in 1966
School districts in Luzerne County, Pennsylvania
1966 establishments in Pennsylvania
Pittston, Pennsylvania